Folk revival may refer to:

 American folk music revival
 British folk revival
 Roots revival 
 Roots Revival (project)